Bang Phra station is a railway station located in Bang Phra Subdistrict, Si Racha District, Chonburi Province.

References 

Railway stations in Thailand
Chonburi province